Caenorhabditis guadeloupensis is a species of nematodes, in the same genus as the model organism Caenorhabditis elegans. This species was collected  from rotten Heliconia flowers on the Soufrière Forest trail, in Guadeloupe, France.

This species is at the basis of the 'Drosophilae' supergroup in phylogenetic studies.

References 

guadeloupensis
Nematodes described in 2014
Fauna of Guadeloupe